was a Japanese race car driver. He formerly raced in the Japanese Grand Touring Championship, currently known as Super GT.

Yamaji's race debut was in 1986. He competed for YOURS Sports in the RX-7 at the JSS race at Fuji. He went on to take the championship in the RX-7 class of the Fuji Freshman Race series and from 1994 moved up to the All Japan GT Championship. He is widely remembered for an incident that occurred at the start of the 1998 race at Fuji in which, following a serious accident that resulted in an outbreak of fire, he rushed over to the stricken car and frantically worked to extinguish the engulfing flames. Thanks to his heroic efforts the driver, Tetsuya Ota, was able to escape with his life. In recent years he served as the Clerk of the Course at various events such as Fuji Speedway races and the D1 Grand Prix. In 2011, he retired from Super GT300. On May 25, 2014 he checked into the hospital due to worsening conditions and he died the following day.

Complete JGTC/Super GT Results 
(key) (Races in bold indicate pole position) (Races in italics indicate fastest lap)

References

1964 births
2014 deaths
Super GT drivers
Japanese racing drivers
24 Hours of Le Mans drivers

TOM'S drivers